Aubenas Aerodrome or Aubenas Ardèche méridionale Aerodrome  is an airport in Lanas, a commune in Ardèche, France.

Statistics

References 

 Aérodrome d'Aubenas - Ardèche méridionale at Union des Aéroports Français

External links 

Airports in Auvergne-Rhône-Alpes
Buildings and structures in Ardèche